Tilera Corporation was a fabless semiconductor company focusing on manycore embedded processor design. The company shipped multiple processors, including the TILE64, TILEPro64, and the TILEPro36, TILE-Gx72, TILE-Gx36, TILE-Gx16 and TILE-Gx9.

After a series of company acquisitions. Tilera's intellectual property was eventually acquired by Mellanox, which now ships products that descend from the original Tilera designs.

History 
In 1990, Anant Agarwal led a team of researchers at Massachusetts Institute of Technology to develop scalable multi-processor system built out of large numbers of single chip processors. Alewife machines integrated both shared memory and user-level message passing for inter-node communications.

In 1997, Agarwal proposed a follow-on project using a mesh technology to connect multiple cores. The follow-on project, named RAW, commenced in 1997, and was supported by DARPA/NSF's funding of tens of millions, resulting in the first 16-processor tiles multicore and proving the mesh and compiler technology.

Tilera was founded in October 2004, by Agarwal, Devesh Garg, and Vijay K. Aggarwal. Tilera launched its first product, the 64-core TILE64 processor, in August 2007. Tilera raised more than $100 million in venture funding from Bessemer Venture Partners, Walden International, Columbia Capital and VentureTech Alliance, with strategic investments from Broadcom, Quanta Computer and NTT. The company was headquartered in San Jose, California and operated a research and development facility in Westborough, Massachusetts, USA. It had Sales and Support Centers in Shenzhen China, Yokohama Japan, and Europe.

In July 2014, Tilera was acquired by EZchip Semiconductor, a company that develops high-performance multi-core network processors, for $130 million in cash. EZchip was later acquired by Mellanox Technologies. Tilera web shows that it belongs to nVidia.

Products 
Tilera's primary product family was the Tile CPU. Tile is a multicore design, with the cores communicating via a new mesh architecture, called iMesh, intended to scale to hundreds of cores on a single chip. The goal was to provide a high-performance CPU, with good power efficiency, and with greater flexibility than special-purpose processors such as DSPs. In October 2009, the company announced a new chip family TILE-Gx based on 40 nm technology that features up to 72 cores at 1.2 GHz. Other TILE-Gx family members include 9-, 16-, 36-core variants.

Their markets for this product announced in October 2011, included:
 Cloud computing applications such as web indexing, search engine and cache acceleration servers
 Networking equipment including intelligent routers, firewalls, network test equipment, and forensic / data-mining applications
 Multimedia applications such as videoconferencing, broadcast video servers, and edge QAM systems
 Wireless infrastructure such as 4G Node B Base Station, RNC, and media gateways

The 36-core general purpose CPU consumes approximately 35 watts at full load.

In October 2010, version 2.6.36 of the mainline Linux kernel added support for the Tilera architecture.

Tilera also provided software development tools called the Multicore Development Environment (MDE) for Tile, and a line of boards built around the Tile processors.

The networking software company 6WIND provided high-performance packet processing software for the TilePro64 platform.

On 25 July 2011, TilePro processor was found by Facebook to be three times more energy-efficient than Intel's x86, based on Facebook's experiments on servers using TilePro processor and Intel's x86.

In November 2012, MikroTik became the first manufacturer to ship devices based on the Tile-GX processors, the product line is called Cloud Core Router.

As of June 2018, the Linux kernel has dropped support for this architecture.

See also 
 Calxeda
 x86
 ARM
 Intel Corporation
 Advanced Micro Devices
 Broadcom
 Manycore

References

External links 
 
 
 
 
 
 
  Interview of Anant Agarwal.

2004 establishments in Massachusetts
2014 disestablishments in Massachusetts
2014 mergers and acquisitions
American companies established in 2004
American companies disestablished in 2014
Companies based in Massachusetts
Computer companies established in 2004
Computer companies disestablished in 2014
Defunct computer companies of the United States
Electronics companies established in 2004
Electronics companies disestablished in 2014
Electronics companies of the United States
Manycore processors
Parallel computing
Reconfigurable computing